= The Empathic Practitioner =

1994 anthology edited by Ellen Singer More and Maureen A. Milligan

The Empathic Practitioner: Empathy, Gender, and Medicine
- Editor: Ellen Singer More; Maureen A Milligan
- Language: English
- Publisher: Rutgers University Press
- Publication date: 1994
- Pages: 266
- ISBN: 0-8135-2118-1

The Empathic Practitioner: Empathy, Gender, and Medicine is a collection of essays written mostly by women in medicine. Edited by Ellen Singer More and Maureen A. Milligan, it was published in 1994 by Rutgers University Press.

== Reception ==
Richard E. Peschel wrote in JAMA that The Empathetic Practitioner was "highly recommended."
